Boadu Maxwell Acosty (born 10 September 1991) is an Italian-Ghanaian professional footballer who plays as a winger for K League 1 club Suwon Samsung Bluewings.

Club career

AC Reggiana 1919
Acosty started his youth and senior career with Italian club Reggiana in the 2008–09 Lega Pro Prima Divisione season before going on to sign for Fiorentina in July 2009.

ACF Fiorentina

Acosty made his Serie A debut for Fiorentina on January 22, 2012, in a match against Cagliari when he came on as a substitute in the 64th minute for teammate Adem Ljajić.

FC Anyang
After having played for HNK Rijeka in the Croatian First Football League between 2017 and 2020, Acosty joined Korean second division side FC Anyang in February 2020 as free transfer.

Career statistics

Honours
Rijeka
Croatian Cup: 2018–19
Individual
K League 2 Top Assist Provider Award: 2022

References

External links
 
 
 

1991 births
Living people
Ghanaian footballers
Naturalised citizens of Italy
Association football forwards
Serie A players
Serie B players
Serie C players
Croatian Football League players
K League 2 players
K League 1 players
A.C. Reggiana 1919 players
ACF Fiorentina players
S.S. Juve Stabia players
A.C. ChievoVerona players
A.C. Carpi players
Modena F.C. players
Latina Calcio 1932 players
F.C. Crotone players
HNK Rijeka players
FC Anyang players
Suwon Samsung Bluewings players
Ghanaian expatriate footballers
Expatriate footballers in Croatia
Ghanaian expatriates in Croatia
Expatriate footballers in South Korea
Ghanaian expatriates in South Korea